Acanthodaphne basicincta is a species of sea snail, a marine gastropod mollusk in the family Raphitomidae.

Description
The length of the shell attains 7 mm.

Distribution
This species occurs in the Pacific Ocean off the Solomon Islands; also off Papua New Guinea.

References

 Morassi, M. & Bonfitto, A. (2010) New raphitomine gastropods (Gastropoda: Conidae: Raphitominae) from the South-West Pacific. Zootaxa, 2526:54-68

External links
 Gastropods.com: Acanthodaphne basicincta

basicincta
Gastropods described in 2010